NYC Surgical Associates (NYCSA), is one of the largest multi-specialty surgical practices in the United States. Based in New York, the company consists of seven sites founded by David Greuner and Adam Tonis.

History

NYC Surgical Associates was founded by David Greuner and Adam Tonis in 2009. It specializes in the treatment for several diseases such as lipedema, pelvic congestion, uterine fibroids, and lymphedema. The centres that make up the institution include the Pelvic Institute, Hernia Center, Lipedema Center, Vein and Vascular Center, Reconstructive and Cosmetic Surgery Institute.

Divisions
 Interventional and Endovascular surgery
Hernia surgery
Reconstructive surgery

References

Privately held companies based in New York City